Sky Hall Toyota is an arena in Toyota, Aichi, Japan.

Events
2007 Fed Cup
Dunlop World Challenge

Facilities
Main Hall 3,600m2
Sub Hall 1,745m2
Budojo
Studio
Training room
Climbing wall
Running course
Conference room

References

Basketball venues in Japan
Indoor arenas in Japan
SeaHorses Mikawa
Sports venues in Aichi Prefecture
Tennis venues in Japan
Venues of the 2026 Asian Games
Asian Games table tennis venues
Toyota, Aichi
Sports venues completed in 2007
2007 establishments in Japan